St. Dominic Catholic Church is a Catholic parish church of the Roman Rite on Main Street in Springfield, Kentucky, in the Archdiocese of Louisville.

The red Romanesque building was built in 1890 and added to the National Register of Historic Places in 1989. It has a pyramidal tower and roof shingled with fishscale slate. It is the parish's second church, replacing an 1843 construction.

References

External links
 
Diocese listing of parish

National Register of Historic Places in Washington County, Kentucky
Churches on the National Register of Historic Places in Kentucky
Roman Catholic churches completed in 1890
Roman Catholic churches in Springfield, Kentucky
Roman Catholic Archdiocese of Louisville
Religious organizations established in 1843
19th-century Roman Catholic church buildings in the United States
1890 establishments in Kentucky
Romanesque Revival architecture in Kentucky